SentrySafe is a brand of safes manufactured in Rochester, New York. It is owned by the Master Lock Company. It markets safes designed for home, business, and gun storage. In addition to security, SentrySafe includes a range of Underwriters Laboratories (UL)-rated safes to protect valuables from both fire and water.

History
In 1930, John Brush, Sr. and his brother-in-law, Willard Punnett, opened a small shop for the manufacture of safes at 545 West Avenue in Rochester, New York. The Brush-Punnett Company was a pioneer in the stamping (metalworking) of steel safes. During a long and arduous startup period that spanned the Great Depression and World War II, the company had some success by selling safes to Vassar College for its dormitories and steel skids to Eastman Kodak.

In 1943, after purchasing his sister and brother's-in-law interest, John Brush Sr. became the sole owner of the company. It was Brush's intent to pass the business on to his sons John Jr., Richard, and Robert. John Jr. joined the business in 1954 after serving in the U.S. Army Air Corps, and graduating from St. Lawrence University (1950) and Harvard Business School. The company changed its name to John D. Brush & Co. in 1955.

In 1987, it began doing business under the name Sentry Group, in order to better identify the company with its trademark name safes — "Sentry".

Sentry Group produces more fire-resistant chests, safes, security storage containers, and gun safes than any other company in the world and has won several awards, including "Vendor of the Year" from Lowe's in 1999, Wal-Mart in 2001, and OfficeMax in 2002.

In 2014 Sentry was sold to Master Lock, which is a division of Fortune Brands Home & Security.

In 2016 Master Lock closed the Rochester, NY based production facilities and moved production to Mexico.

Legal cases
In 1991, Michael Redman of Virginia brought a product liability suit against Sentry Group after his coin collection was stolen out of his Sentry Supreme Safe, Model #5570. Redman noticed the safe in a Value-Tique advertisement that appeared in the magazine Coin World. The magazine had advertised the safe as a “burglar deterrent”.

Redman won the jury verdict in district court, but the case was appealed. The United States Court of Appeals for the Fourth Circuit reversed the decision, holding that Redman failed to present evidence demonstrating that the safe violated industry standards, government standards, or reasonable consumer expectations. Redman's safe was specifically designed to meet fire-resistant standards, but not “burglar deterrent” standards, even though it did provide “a degree of protection against burglary.”  An expert witness testified that materials that enhance burglar-resistance on safes consequently reduce the fire-resistance.

Notes

References
 "About SentrySafe"
 "Made In Our Hometown: SentrySafe, 13Wham, December 2012" 
 "At Sentry, Employees Feel Secure", R News website
 "Alfred University Presents Awards to Four Rochester-area Family Businesses", AU Press Release 5/24/01, Alfred University website
 "Schumer Pushes Tax Credit For Gun Safes - Could Boost Jobs at Rochester Safemaker" Senator Charles E. Schumer website
 "Sentry Group begins making large capacity gun safes here", Rochester Business Journal, by Andrea Deckert, August 29, 2005.
 Sentry Safe Guide
 "The Story of an American Small Business," Sentry Group company pamphlet, 2005.
 "Fireproof hard drives unveiled by Sentry," Rochester Democrat & Chronicle, November 15, 2007, available at http://www.democratandchronicle.com/apps/pbcs.dll/article?AID=/20071115/BUSINESS/71115006/1001
 "Sentry Group Partners with Maxtor Storage Solutions on Fire-Safe/Waterproof Hard Drives," Sentry Group Press Release, November 13, 2007, available at https://web.archive.org/web/20071117121254/http://www.sentrysafe.com/content/news.aspx
"Last day for many Sentry Safe workers in Pittsford", 13WHAM, June 2016,   http://13wham.com/news/local/last-day-for-many-sentry-safe-workers-in-pittsford

External links
 

Manufacturing companies established in 1930
1930 establishments in New York (state)
Security equipment manufacturers